The northern Indian state of Uttar Pradesh, which borders Nepal, comprises 18 administrative divisions. Within these 18 divisions, there are a total of 75 districts. The following table shows the name of each division, its administrative capital city, its constituent districts, and a map of its location.

See also
 Districts of Uttar Pradesh
 List of RTO districts in Uttar Pradesh